Scleronema is a genus of pencil catfishes native to South America. They are a member of the subfamily Trichomycterinae. Species of Scleronema are geographically distributed in the La Plata basin and Atlantic coastal drainages from Southern Brazil, Southern Paraguay, Northeastern Argentina and Uruguay. They inhabit rivers or streams with sand or gravel-bottoms across the Pampa grasslands. In Greek, Scleronema means "hard filament."

Species
There are currently three recognized species in this genus:
 Scleronema angustirostre (Devincenzi, 1942)
 Scleronema minutum (Boulenger, 1891)
 Scleronema operculatum C. H. Eigenmann, 1917

S. minutum and S. operculatum both originate from Rio Grande do Sul, Brazil; S. minutum 4.0 cm (1.6 in) SL and S. operculatum 8.0 cm (3.1 in). S. minutum and S. operculatum usually live in a freshwater, tropical environment. S. operculatum are harmless to humans.

Scleronema angustirostre 
As of 2017, S. angustirostre has been deemed a prohibited nonnative species in Florida, meaning the species is a danger to the ecology, health, and/or welfare of Florida and its residents. Like other species of Scleronema, S. angustirostre thrive in a freshwater environment and are benthopelagic, meaning that they either live at the surface or bottom of a body of water.

References

Trichomycteridae
Fish of South America
Fish of Brazil
Fish of Uruguay
Catfish genera
Freshwater fish genera
Taxa named by Carl H. Eigenmann